Benkiyalli Aralida Hoovu is a 1983 Indian Kannada language film directed by K. Balachander and produced by Chandulal Jain. It revolves around Kavitha (Suhasini) who wonders when she will have time to live her own life, as she is too busy taking care of her mother, siblings, and her alcoholic brother's family. It was also the official Kannada debut of South Indian refining star of the 80s & 90s eras, Suhasini.

The film was directed by K. Balachander and is a remake of his Tamil film Aval Oru Thodar Kathai (1974). Kamal Haasan, who played a major role there, played a different role here. Suhasini won the Filmfare Award for Best Actress – Kannada for her performance.

Plot 
Kavitha is the sole breadwinner of her family comprising her mother, widowed sister Bharati, an unmarried younger sister, a blind younger brother, a drunkard elder brother Murthy, his wife and children. Her father had abandoned the family and become a sadhu. Conscious of her family responsibilities, Kavitha keeps postponing her marriage indefinitely to her long-time boyfriend Tilak. Kavitha's friend Chandra takes life easy and keeps changing boyfriends. Tilak, who patiently waits for Kavitha, meets Bharati, pities her and slowly becomes passionate about her. On learning this, Kavitha sacrifices her love and gets them married. Murthy changes his wayward behaviour, becomes responsible and works as a bearer at a restaurant. An impressed Kavitha accepts him as the head of the family. Kavitha's boss Arun Ghosh offers to marry her, but Kavitha does not give a positive reply.

Chandra dates Chandrasekhar, a womaniser and colleague of Kavitha, despite her warnings. Earlier, when Chandrasekhar had written a love letter to Kavitha, she complained about it to her boss, who then reprimanded Chandrasekhar. Hence, Kavitha does not approve of Chandra's relationship with him. A lustful Chandrasekhar also dates Chandra's widowed mother; on learning this, Chandra attempts suicide. Kavitha and her co-tenant Gopal save Chandra and advise her to marry Gopal. In turn, Chandra advises Kavitha to marry Ghosh. Kavitha accepts the marriage proposal as she now feels confident about Murthy taking care of the family.

On the day of the wedding, Murthy's wife asks him to get back the silver lamp pledged by him earlier, to be gifted to Kavitha for her wedding. While returning to the wedding hall, he seeks a lift from Chandrasekhar, not knowing him. Murthy realises that Chandrasekhar is actually coming to stop the marriage of Kavitha and Chandra when Chandrasekhar states that he had affairs with both of them. Murthy pleads with him not to come to the marriage hall and create any confusion, but Chandrasekhar refuses. A scuffle ensues in which Murthy is killed by Chandrasekhar using the lamp before the police arrest Chandrasekhar. When the marriage is about to take place, Kavitha learns of her brother's death from the police. She then convinces Ghosh to accept her younger sister as the bride as she needs to support her family again. At the same time, Chandra marries Gopal. Kavitha returns to taking care of her family like before.

Cast 
 Suhasini as Kavitha
 Jai Jagadish as Tilak
 Ramakrishna as Gopal
 Rajeev as Krishnamurthy
 Sarath Babu as Kavitha's boss
 Vijayalakshmi Singh as Chandra
 Pavithra
 Sunder Raj as Chandrashekar
 Leelavathi as Kavitha's mother
 Kamal Haasan as a Bus conductor (Cameo)

Production 
Benkiyalli Aralida Hoovu is the Kannada remake of the Tamil film Aval Oru Thodar Kathai (1974). Suhasini played the female lead, and her uncle Kamal Haasan (who appeared in the Tamil original) made a cameo appearance as a bus conductor.

Balachander's favourite heroine Saritha was initially approached for the lead role but she could not accommodate her dates. Suhasini who had just signed the big budget Kannada movie Bandhana landed the role. Saritha gave her the voice over. Suhasini recommended her friend Vijayalakshmi Singh for the role of the ultra modern girl in the movie.

Soundtrack 
M. S. Viswanathan composed the music for the soundtracks and lyrics written by Chi. Udaya Shankar. The album consists of five soundtracks.

Accolades 
 Suhasini – Filmfare Award for Best Actress – Kannada

References

External links 
 

1980s Kannada-language films
1983 films
Films about women in India
Films directed by K. Balachander
Films scored by M. S. Viswanathan
Films with screenplays by K. Balachander
Kannada remakes of Tamil films